"Train in Vain" is a song by the British punk rock band the Clash. It was released as the third and final single from their third studio album, London Calling (1979). The song was not originally listed on the album's track listing,<ref name="blender-Train_in_Vain">{{cite web|url=http://www.blender.com/guide/articles.aspx?id=299 |title=The Greatest Songs Ever! "Train in Vain (Stand by Me)" Article on Blender :: The Ultimate Guide to Music and More |access-date=2 December 2007 |last=Black |first=Johnny |date=May 2002 |format=ASPX |publisher=Blender |quote=a, b) Thrown together at the last minute in the dying hours of sessions for the Clash's classic 1980 album, London Calling, 'Train in Vain (Stand by Me)' was not even listed on the record's cover. It was the Clash song that almost wasn't, but it turned out to be the one that brought the band into the Top 30 for the first time.c) 'Train in Vain', written in one night and recorded the next day, was initially going to be given away as a promotion with the British rock magazine New Musical Express. Only after that failed to happen did the band consider the song for inclusion on the album.d) As Wessex Studios' manager and house engineer Bill Price points out, 'Train in Vain' was 'the last song we finished after the artwork went to the printer. A couple of Clash Web sites describe it as a hidden track, but it wasn't intended to be hidden. The sleeve was already printed before we tacked the song on the end of the master tape.'e) The meaning of the song's title is equally obscure. Sometimes it seems as if every little boy who once dreamed of growing up to be a train engineer became a songwriter instead. With the Clash, however, things are never quite what they seem — and no train is mentioned in the song. Mick Jones, who wrote most of it, offers a prosaic explanation: 'The track was like a train rhythm, and there was, once again, that feeling of being lost.'f) Another curious aspect of "Train in Vain", given the Clash's political stance and reputation for social consciousness, is that it's a love song, with an almost country-and-western lyric that echoes Tammy Wynette's classic weepie "Stand by Your Man".g) If the Clash were hard-line British punks who despised America as much as their song 'I'm So Bored with the USA' suggested, why did 'Train in Vain' have such a made-in-the-USA feel? Strummer has admitted that despite the band's anti-American posturing, much of its inspiration came from this side of the Atlantic Ocean. 'I was drenched in blues and English R&B as a teenager,' the singer says. 'Then I went to black American R&B with my [pre-Clash] group the 101ers. Mick had heard a lot of that stuff too, and he had this extra dimension of the glam/trash New York Dolls/Stooges scene.'h, i) 'Train in Vain'... has become a Clash standard, covered by artists as diverse as EMF, Dwight Yoakam, Annie Lennox and Third Eye Blind. Its influence crops up elsewhere, too: Listening to 'Train in Vain' and Garbage's 'Stupid Girl' in succession makes clear where Garbage drummer and producer Butch Vig located 'Stupid Girls distinctive drum loops. |url-status=dead |archive-url=https://web.archive.org/web/20090221070346/http://www.blender.com/guide/articles.aspx?id=299 |archive-date=21 February 2009 }}</ref> appearing as a hidden track at the end of the album. This was because the track was added to the record at the last minute, when the sleeve was already in production. Some editions include the song in the track listing. It was the first Clash song to reach the United States Top 30 charts and in 2010, the song was ranked number 298 on Rolling Stone magazine's list of The 500 Greatest Songs of All Time.

In the US, the song's title is expanded to "Train in Vain (Stand by Me)", as the words "stand by me" dominate the chorus. It was titled "Train in Vain" in part to avoid confusion with Ben E. King's signature song "Stand by Me".

Origins

"Train in Vain" was added after the deal for the band to write a song for an NME flexi disc fell through, and as Mick Jones later said "The real story on 'Train in Vain' is that originally we needed a song to give to the NME for a flexi disk that NME was going to do. And then it was decided that it didn't work out or decided the flexi disk didn't work out so we had this spare track we had done as a giveaway. So we put it on London Calling but there wasn't time because the sleeves were already done." The result of its late addition was that it was the only song without lyrics printed on the insert, and was not listed as a track, but its title and position on the original vinyl record was scratched into the vinyl in the needle run-off area on the fourth side of the album.

Meaning and inspiration
When the album London Calling (1979) was released, many fans assumed it was called "Stand by Me", but the meaning of the song's title is obscure as the title phrase cannot be found in the lyrics. Mick Jones, who wrote most of the song, offered this explanation: "The track was like a train rhythm, and there was, once again, that feeling of being lost."

The song has been interpreted by some as a response to "Typical Girls" by the Slits, which mentions girls standing by their men. Mick Jones split up with Slits guitarist Viv Albertine shortly before he wrote the song.

The song has been interpreted to be about Jones' volatile relationship with Albertine, who commented "I'm really proud to have inspired that but often he won't admit to it. He used to get the train to my place in Shepherd's Bush and I would not let him in. He was bleating on the doorstep. That was cruel". The couple separated around the time of the recording sessions for London Calling (1979).

Critical receptionCash Box wrote that this was Clash's "most commercial effort...to date," stating that "an infectious rhythm has supplanted the three chord guitar attack" and added that Joe Strummer's playing is "more restrained but equally as effective." Record World wrote that "Mick Jones' vocals reach expressive cries and the overall sound has a crisp, rockabilly feel that should move the Clash into best-seller status."

Formats and track listings
"Train in Vain" was released in mainland Europe as a 33 rpm single in June 1980 (catalogue number CBS 8370) and included the tracks "Bankrobber" and "Rockers Galore... UK Tour". In the UK, "Train in Vain" was not released as a single at the time; only "Bankrobber" and "Rockers Galore... UK Tour" were released on a 7" single in August 1980 (catalogue number CBS 8323). The song was released in the US as a 10" white label promo in 1979 (catalogue number AS 749). The US commercial release of 12 February 1980 (catalogue number 50851) consisted of a 7" that included the track "London Calling". The 1991 UK re-release (catalogue number 657430 7) included the track "The Right Profile". The formats and track listings of "Train in Vain (Stand By Me)" are tabulated below:

"Train in Vain" also features on the Clash albums The Story of the Clash, Volume 1 (1988), Clash on Broadway (1991), The Singles (1991), From Here to Eternity: Live (1999) (live version recorded on 13 June 1981 at Bond's Casino, New York), The Essential Clash (2003), Singles Box (2006) (disc eleven — Spanish 7" issue),  The Singles (2007), Sound System (2013) and The Clash Hits Back (2013).

Personnel
 Mick Jones — lead vocals, guitar, harmonica
 Joe Strummer — piano
 Paul Simonon — bass guitar
 Topper Headon — drums, percussion
 Mick Gallagher — organ

Charts

Certifications

Covers and samples
"Train in Vain" has become an influential and well-known Clash song, covered by artists as diverse as the British indie dance band EMF, American country singer Dwight Yoakam, and San Francisco rockers Third Eye Blind.

Annie Lennox recorded a soulful, dance-beat cover of the song on her 1995 album Medusa, and performed the song in her appearance during the twentieth season of Saturday Night Live''.

Drummer and producer Butch Vig of the U.S. rock group Garbage used a drum loop from "Train in Vain" in 1996 for the Garbage song "Stupid Girl". Joe Strummer and Mick Jones received a co-writing credit and royalties from the Garbage song under its original release. In 2007, when the song was remastered for a Garbage greatest hits album, the writing credit for the song named all four members of the Clash.

References

External links

1979 songs
1980 singles
The Clash songs
British rock songs
Songs written by Mick Jones (The Clash)
Songs written by Joe Strummer
CBS Records singles
Columbia Records singles
Song recordings produced by Guy Stevens